This is a list of records from the West Australian Football League (WAFL) since its inception in 1885 (formerly known as the West Australian Football Association, West Australian National Football League, Western Australia State Football League and Westar Rules).

Team Records

Highest Score 

Note: The score of 41.30 (276) by East Perth against South Fremantle in 1944 was in an under-19 competition due to the loss of players to serve in World War II, and is excluded in some sources. The score of 40.18 (258) by South Fremantle against West Perth in 1981 is the record in WAFL senior competition.

Lowest Score

Most Consecutive Wins

Player Records

Most games 

Note: These figures refer to premiership matches (i.e. home-and-away and finals) matches only.

Most career goals

Most goals in a season

Most goals in a game

Most Sandover Medals

See also

List of VFL/AFL records
List of AFL Women's records
List of SANFL records
List of Tasmanian Football League records

References

WAFL records
Australian rules football records and statistics